Unai Osa Eizaguirre (born 12 June 1975 in Zestoa) is a Spanish former road bicycle racer. He is the younger brother of Aitor Osa. He was involved in the Operación Puerto doping case.

Palmarès

1999
1st, Classique des Alpes
1st, Overall, Tour de l'Avenir
2001
3rd, Overall, Giro d'Italia
2003
9th, Overall, Vuelta a España

Grand Tour general classification results timeline

See also
 List of doping cases in cycling

References

External links
Profile by world-of-cycling.com

 

1975 births
Cyclists from the Basque Country (autonomous community)
Spanish male cyclists
Living people
Doping cases in cycling
Spanish sportspeople in doping cases
People from Urola Kosta
Sportspeople from Gipuzkoa